Certance, LLC, was a privately held company  engaged in design and manufacture of computer tape drives. 

Based in Costa Mesa, California, Certance designed and manufactured drives using a variety of tape formats, including Travan, DDS, and Linear Tape-Open computer tape drives. Certance was one of the three original technology partners, (Certance, IBM, and Hewlett Packard), that created the Linear Tape-Open technology. 

In 2005, Certance was acquired by Quantum Corporation.

History
The company began as the removable storage systems division of Seagate Technology. The division was formed in 1996 from storage companies Archive Corporation, Irwin Magnetic Systems, Cipher Data Products, and Maynard Electronics. In a restructuring involving Seagate Technology and Veritas Software, the division was spun off in 2000 into the independent company Seagate Removable Storage Systems. The company was the worldwide unit volume shipment leader in 2001, 2002, and 2003. 

The company name was changed to "Certance" in 2003. In 2004, Quantum Corporation announced plans to acquire Certance. The acquisition was completed in 2005, whereupon Certance ceased to exist as an independent company.

References

Computer storage companies
Companies based in Costa Mesa, California
Defunct technology companies of the United States
Defunct computer hardware companies
1996 establishments in California
2005 establishments in California
2005 mergers and acquisitions
Technology companies established in 1996
Technology companies disestablished in 2005